Münchener Freiheit is a German 1985 television series directed by Jörg Grünler that was broadcast on ZDF in 7 episodes with each episode lasting 45 minutes. The lead role of Ludwig Appler is played by Reiner Horst Scheibe. The music was written by Mick Baumeister.

It tells the story of Ludwig Appler, a resettler from the German Democratic Republic in the German Federal Republic, where he works as a construction manager on various construction sites. Since he is constantly on the move, he confines himself to a life in the workplace. He has no own family, has no permanent residence, and lives in the trailer. One day, however, his life changes dramatically. His company goes broke, he loses his job and is plagued by financial difficulties, leading to bankruptcy and homelessness. Desperately, he strolls through everyday life, in search of a way out. Finally, he gets to know the homeless on Münchner Freiheit square. Bound by a similar fate, he suddenly feels a connection to them and joins them, learning how to make record and defy the adversities of hard life on the margins of society.

Cast
Reiner Horst Scheibe as Ludwig Appler
Ilona Grandke as Anna Zechlin
Erich Will as Franz
Tilo Prückner as Alex
Billie Zöckler as Margie

Episodes
 "Aus heiterem Himmel"
 "Heimwärts"
 "Abgesoffen"
 "Bombenstimmung"
 "Plattenwechsel"
 "Hürdenlauf"
 "Zur Feier des Tages"

See also
List of German television series

1985 German television series debuts
1985 German television series endings
Television shows set in Munich
German-language television shows
ZDF original programming